Bradburn is a ghost town in the Rural Municipality of Dufferin, Manitoba, Canada near the town of Carman.  Founded in 1906, it was a stop on the Midland Railway. The town died after the railway closed and the tracks were taken up, in 1926.

External links
 Bradburn ghost town website

Ghost towns in Manitoba